Thayer House may refer to:

in the United States (by state then city)
Thayer Lake East Shelter Cabin, Angoon, Alaska, listed on the National Register of Historic Places (NRHP) in Hoonah–Angoon Census Area
Thayer Lake North Shelter Cabin, Angoon, Alaska, NRHP-listed in Hoonah–Angoon Census Area
Thayer Lake South Shelter Cabin, Angoon, Alaska, NRHP-listed in Hoonah–Angoon Census Area
Gen. Sylvanus Thayer House, Braintree, Massachusetts, listed on the NRHP in Norfolk County 
Nathaniel Thayer Estate, Lancaster, Massachusetts, listed on the NRHP in Worcester County
Thayer House (Newton, Massachusetts), listed on the NRHP in Middlesex County
H. Elmer Thayer House, Flint, Michigan, listed on the National Register of Historic Places in Genesee County
Thayer House (Thompson Falls, Montana), listed on the National Register of Historic Places in Sanders County
John M. Thayer House, Lincoln, Nebraska, listed on the National Register of Historic Places in Lancaster County
Thayer Farmstead, Mexico, New York, listed on the NRHP in Oswego County
Thayer Farm Site (31RD10), Asheboro, North Carolina, listed on the NRHP in Randolph County
Thayer-Thompson House, Erie, Pennsylvania, listed on the NRHP in Erie County